Andre or Andrea Ryder, born Andreas Anagnostou or Anagnostis (1908–1971) was a Greek-Egyptian composer who lived and worked in Egypt in his later years.
 
Ryder travelled to Egypt and lived there and worked as a film composer, and was granted Egyptian citizenship in 1970. He composed music for 61 Egyptian films and 6 Greek films. His Egyptian films include; El Ard el Tayeba (1954), Wakeful Eyes (1956), The Second Man (1959), Forbidden Women (1959), El Hub Keda (1961), Letter from an Unknown Woman (1962), Aghla Min Hayati (1965). 

Ryder was awarded the Order of the Republic by President Gamal Abdel Nasser. He was celebrated as Best Composer in The Centenary of Andre Ryder held at Bibliotheca Alexandrina in 2008.

Ryder was killed in a fight in Buenos Aires, Argentina, during one of his tours on 5 March 1971.

Andre was a black belt in judo, muggers tried to rob him and roughing up ladies accompanying him he went into a fight but was stabbed to death

References 

1908 births
1971 deaths
Egyptian composers
Egyptian film score composers
Greek emigrants to Egypt
Greek composers
Greek film score composers
Male film score composers
20th-century composers
20th-century male musicians